Hareaipha "Simba" Marumo (born 6 January 1978) is a South African former soccer player who played as a striker.

As a teenager, he played for Inter Milan's youth academy.

References

1978 births
Living people
People from Matjhabeng Local Municipality
South African soccer players
South Africa international soccer players
FC Chernomorets Burgas players
FC Septemvri Sofia players
Mamelodi Sundowns F.C. players
Moroka Swallows F.C. players
Platinum Stars F.C. players
Association football forwards
Soccer players from the Free State (province)
First Professional Football League (Bulgaria) players
Expatriate footballers in Bulgaria